Chrysallida vignali is a species of sea snail, a marine gastropod mollusk in the family Pyramidellidae, the pyrams and their allies. The species is one of a number within the genus Chrysallida.

Distribution
This species occurs in the following locations:
 Madagascar

References

External links
 To Encyclopedia of Life
 To World Register of Marine Species

vignali
Gastropods described in 1910